Ari Gold may refer to the following persons:

 Ari Gold (filmmaker) (born 1970), American filmmaker, actor, and musician
 Ari Gold (musician) (19742021), American pop singer and songwriter

Ari Gold may also refer to:

 Ari Gold (Entourage), a character in the HBO comedy Entourage
 Ari Gold (album), eponymous album, released 2001

See also 

 Ari L. Goldman (born 1949), Professor of Journalism at Columbia University and former reporter for The New York Times
 Ari Goldwag (born 1979), Jewish recording artist